Ajuga orientalis, also known as Oriental bugle and Eastern bugle, is a herbaceous flowering plant native to the Eastern Mediterranean. It is found in the sandy, dry brushwood and lightly forested regions of the coast. It is usually evergreen, although it may be briefly deciduous in cold winters.

Description
They contain 4 to 12 flowers which are tube shaped, long and cream/violet coloured. The stamens are found inside.

Uses
This species, alongside most other Ajuga, claim to have medicinal effects, being used in traditional Turkish medicine.

References

External links

orientalis
Flora of Europe
Taxa named by Carl Linnaeus
Groundcovers
Flora of the Mediterranean Basin